Old Brompton Road is a major street in the South Kensington district of The Royal Borough of Kensington and Chelsea, London.

It starts from South Kensington Underground station and runs south-west, through a mainly residential area, until it reaches West Brompton and the area around Earl's Court tube station. It runs through the SW5 and SW7 postcodes.

There are several 5-star hotels and upmarket shops along the road. One of the most famous auction houses in the world, Christie's, was located near the eastern end of the road at number 85.

The Coleherne pub (now The Pembroke), located at number 261, became well known for being the stalking ground for three serial killers, Dennis Nilsen, Michael Lupo and Colin Ireland. It is also mentioned in the song 'Hanging Around' by The Stranglers, as well as in Armistead Maupin's Tales of the City book Babycakes.

Another landmark of the road is the Troubadour which has been a cultural hub for over fifty years. The coffee-house above, now a restaurant, has hosted the founding of Private Eye and the writing of many books, while the club below has been a venue for Bob Dylan and Adele.

The Drayton Arms is a Grade II listed pub and theatre at number 153.

The most famous resident was Diana, Princess of Wales before her 1981 engagement and subsequent marriage to Charles, Prince of Wales. She shared a flat with three others before subsequently moving on to Clarence House.

The road is sometimes confused with Brompton Road which lies further to the east, in Knightsbridge.

See also
 Brompton, London

References

Streets in the Royal Borough of Kensington and Chelsea
Old Brompton Road
South Kensington